Igor Milošević (Serbian Cyrillic: Игор Милошевић; born April 14, 1986) is a former Greek professional basketball player of Serbian origin. In Greece, he is known as Igkor Milosevits (Greek: Ιγκόρ Μιλόσεβιτς). At a height of 1.93 (6'4") tall, he played at both the point guard and shooting guard positions.

Professional career
Milošević began his professional career in 2003, with the Greek League club Iraklis Thessaloniki. After spending three years with Iraklis, he moved to the Adriatic League club Crvena zvezda, in 2005. After spending three seasons with Crvena zvezda, he moved to the EuroLeague club, Olympiacos Piraeus, in 2008.

In 2009, he moved to the Greek club Maroussi, and in 2010, he joined the Lithuanian League club Lietuvos Rytas In January 2011, he joined the Turkish League club Trabzonspor. In September 2011, he signed a one-year deal with Astana of VTB United League.

In February 2012, he signed with Phantoms Braunschweig of the German League, on a contract through the end of the 2011–12 season. In 2013, he moved to the Greek club Kavala.

On October 9, 2014, Milošević joined the Greek club Kymis, and stayed with them for two seasons. In the 2016–17 season he played with the Greek club Holargos. In July 2017, he signed with the Greek club Peristeri.

National team career
Milošević was a member of the junior Greek national basketball teams. He played at the 2004 FIBA Europe Under-18 Championship, the 2005 FIBA Europe Under-20 Championship, and the 2006 FIBA Europe Under-20 Championship. He also won the silver medal at the 2009 Mediterranean Games, with Greece's under-26 national team.

Awards and accomplishments

Pro career
Serbian Cup Winner: (2006)
Lithuanian Cup Winner: (2010)
Lithuanian League Champion: (2010)
Kazakh Cup Winner: (2012)
2× Greek 2nd Division Champion: (2016, 2018)

Greek national team
2009 Mediterranean Games:

References

External links
Euroleague.net Profile
FIBA Archive Profile
FIBA Europe Profile
Draftexpress Profile
Eurobasket.com Profile
Hellenic Federation Profile 

1986 births
Living people
AEK Larnaca B.C. players
ABA League players
Basketball Löwen Braunschweig players
BC Astana players
BC Rytas players
Competitors at the 2009 Mediterranean Games
Greek expatriate basketball people in Serbia
Greek men's basketball players
Greek Basket League players
Greek people of Serbian descent
Holargos B.C. players
Iraklis Thessaloniki B.C. players
Kavala B.C. players
KK Crvena zvezda players
Kymis B.C. players
Maroussi B.C. players
Mediterranean Games medalists in basketball
Mediterranean Games silver medalists for Greece
Olympiacos B.C. players
Peristeri B.C. players
Point guards
Serbian expatriate basketball people in Cyprus
Serbian expatriate basketball people in Germany
Serbian expatriate basketball people in Greece
Serbian expatriate basketball people in Kazakhstan
Serbian expatriate basketball people in Lithuania
Serbian expatriate basketball people in Turkey
Serbian men's basketball players
Shooting guards
Basketball players from Belgrade
Trabzonspor B.K. players